The 59039 Virar - Valsad Shuttle is a passenger train of the Indian Railways connecting  in Maharashtra and  of Gujarat. It is currently being operated with 59039 train number on a daily basis.

Service

The 59039/Virar - Valsad Shuttle has average speed of 46 km/hr and covers 139 km in 3 hrs.

Route 

Coach composite

The train consists of 18 coaches:

 16 General Unreserved(GEN)
 2 Seating cum Luggage Rake(SLR)

Traction

Train is hauled by a Locomotive shed, Vadodara  based WAP-5 or Locomotive shed, Valsad based WAG-5P.

Rake Sharing

The train shares its rake with 59037/59038 Virar - Surat Passenger, 59040 Vapi - Virar Shuttle, 59045 Bandra Terminus - Vapi Passenger, 59046 Valsad - Bandra Terminus Passenger.

External links 

 59039/Virar - Valsad Shuttle

References 

Transport in Valsad
Rail transport in Gujarat
Rail transport in Maharashtra
Slow and fast passenger trains in India
Transport in Vasai-Virar